Nadiia Kotliar (born November 12, 1993) is a Ukrainian female acrobatic gymnast. With partners Kateryna Bilokon and Olena Karakuts, Kotliar competed in the 2014 Acrobatic Gymnastics World Championships.

References

1993 births
Living people
Ukrainian acrobatic gymnasts
Female acrobatic gymnasts
European Games competitors for Ukraine
Gymnasts at the 2015 European Games